Mikhail Vasilyev may refer to:

 Mikhail Vasilyev (explorer) (1770–1847), Russian explorer and vice admiral of the Imperial Russian Navy
 Mikhail Vasilyev (handballer) (born 1961), Russian handball player